Vladislav Vizilter (born 17 August 1979) is a Kyrgyzstani former boxer. He competed in the men's middleweight event at the 2000 Summer Olympics.

References

External links
 

1979 births
Living people
Kyrgyzstani male boxers
Olympic boxers of Kyrgyzstan
Boxers at the 2000 Summer Olympics
Place of birth missing (living people)
Middleweight boxers